Open Joint Stock Company Dux (formerly Moscow Kommunar Machine-Building Plant) is a company based in Moscow, Russia. It produces air-to-air missiles and launching systems for fighter aircraft and aircraft cabin instrument and components.

The company was established in 1941 as Plant No. 43 of the Ministry of Aviation Industry on the site of the former Plant No. 32, which had been evacuated from Moscow. During the war the factory produced RS-82 rockets, Berezin UB machine guns and other weapons.

From 1963 to 1992 the company was known as Moscow Kommunar Machine-Building Plant. In 1992 the plant became known as Open Joint Stock Company Dux.

See also

 Dux Factory

References

External links
 Official website

Defence companies of Russia
Manufacturing companies based in Moscow
Defence companies of the Soviet Union
Ministry of the Aviation Industry (Soviet Union)
Aircraft component manufacturers of the Soviet Union